Linda Marilina Machuca (born 1 April 2001) is an Argentine freestyle wrestler. She won the silver medal in the girls' freestyle 73 kg event at the 2018 Summer Youth Olympics held in Buenos Aires, Argentina.

At the 2019 Pan American Wrestling Championships, also held in Buenos Aires, Argentina, she won the bronze medal in the women's 72 kg event.

She won the silver medal in the women's 76 kg event at the 2021 Junior Pan American Games held in Cali, Colombia.

References

External links 

 

Living people
2001 births
Place of birth missing (living people)
Argentine female sport wrestlers
Wrestlers at the 2018 Summer Youth Olympics
Pan American Wrestling Championships medalists
21st-century Argentine women